David Lee (born 10 April 1958) is a Singaporean former footballer who played for the Singapore national football team and Geylang United FC as a goalkeeper.

Football career

Club career 
In 1982, Lee, with Fandi Ahmad, joined Indonesian club Niac Mitra. In 1983, Lee left Niac Mitra due to a sudden Galatama League ban on foreign players.

In 1987, Lee joined the Tyrwhitt Soccerites, playing in Division Two in Singapore football.

At the end of 1988, Lee joined Jurong Town FC, despite Tyrwhitt Soccerites promoted from Division Two to Division One in 1988 and then promoted to the FAS Premier League at the end of the 1988 season.

He was part of the Singapore M-League side that won the 1994 Malaysia Cup and M-League title. He had also won the first ever S-league title and Singapore Cup "double", with Geylang Utd in 1996.  He had since retired from professional football in 1997.

Coaching career 
He is the goalkeeping coach of Singapore Armed Forces Football Club currently and trains budding youth goalkeepers at the Singapore Sports School.

Honours
Singapore FA
Malaysia Cup: 1980 1994
Malaysia Premier League: 1994
Sultan Haji Ahmad Shah Cup: 1989

Geylang United
S League: 1996

References

1958 births
Living people
Singaporean sportspeople of Chinese descent
Singaporean footballers
Association football goalkeepers
Geylang International FC players
Singapore FA players
Singapore Premier League players
Singapore international footballers
Competitors at the 1981 Southeast Asian Games
1984 AFC Asian Cup players
Footballers at the 1990 Asian Games
Asian Games competitors for Singapore
Southeast Asian Games silver medalists for Singapore
Southeast Asian Games bronze medalists for Singapore
Southeast Asian Games medalists in football